Taiban is an unincorporated community in De Baca County, New Mexico, United States.

Description
The community is located on New Mexico State Road 252 at U.S. Routes 60 and 84. Founded in 1906 as a ranching community, it was named for nearby Taiban Creek.

The town is famous for being the location where Pat Garrett captured Billy the Kid and his associates on December 23, 1880.

See also

References

External links

 "Lonely church a reminder of once-robust town", Albuquerque Journal, Leslie Linthicum, March 01. 2009

Unincorporated communities in De Baca County, New Mexico
Unincorporated communities in New Mexico